The Tigray War was an armed conflict that lasted from 3 November 2020 to 3 November 2022. The war was primarily fought in the Tigray Region of Ethiopia between the Ethiopian federal government and Eritrea on one side, and the Tigray People's Liberation Front (TPLF) on the other.

After years of increased tensions and hostilities between the TPLF and the governments of Ethiopia and Eritrea, fighting began when Tigrayan security forces attacked the Northern Command headquarters of the Ethiopian National Defense Force (ENDF), alongside a number of other bases in Tigray. The ENDF counterattacked from the south – while Eritrean Defence Forces (EDF) began launching attacks from the north – which Prime Minister Abiy Ahmed described as "law enforcement operations." Federal allied forces captured Mekelle, the capital of the Tigray Region, on 28 November, after which Abiy declared the operation "over." However, the TPLF stated soon afterwards that it would continue fighting until the "invaders" were out, and on 28 June 2021, the Tigray Defense Forces (TDF) retook Mekelle; by July the same year, they had also advanced into the Amhara and Afar regions. In early November 2021, the TDF, together with the Oromo Liberation Army (OLA), took control of several towns on the highway south from Tigray Region towards Addis Ababa, and the TPLF stated that it considered "marching on [the capital]." Together with seven smaller rebel groups, the TPLF and OLA declared a coalition aiming to "dismantle Abiy's government by force or by negotiations, and then form a transitional authority."

After a successful government counter-offensive in response, and then a series of negotiations with the TPLF, Ethiopia declared an indefinite humanitarian truce on 24 March 2022, in order to allow the delivery of humanitarian aid into Tigray. However, fighting dramatically re-escalated in late August 2022, after peace talks broke down. Rapid mobilization of troops soon followed, with Ethiopia, Eritrea and Tigray reportedly organizing hundreds of thousands of troops against each other by October the same year. After a number of peace and mediation proposals in the intervening years, Ethiopia and the Tigrayan rebel forces agreed to a cessation of hostilities on 2 November, which went into effect the day after; Eritrea was not a party to the agreement, however, and their status has remained unclear.

All sides, particularly the ENDF, EDF, and TDF, have committed war crimes during the conflict. Mass extrajudicial killings of civilians have taken place throughout, including in Axum, Bora, Chenna, Kobo, the Hitsats refugee camp, Humera, Mai Kadra, the Debre Abay monastery, and Zalambessa. An estimated 385,000–⁠600,000 people have been killed, and war rape became a "daily" occurrence, with girls as young as 8 and women as old as 72 being raped, often in front of their families. A major humanitarian crisis has developed as a result of the war, with famine becoming widespread. It also inflicted immense economic damage on the region, with the cost of rebuilding alone estimated to be roughly $20 billion.

Background

Historical and political context

Following the end of the Ethiopian Civil War in 1991, Ethiopia became a dominant-party state under the rule of the Ethiopian People's Revolutionary Democratic Front (EPRDF), a coalition of four ethnically based parties dominated by the Tigray People's Liberation Front (TPLF). The founding and most influential member was the TPLF and the chairman was Meles Zenawi, who was the prime minister of Ethiopia until his death in 2012. He was succeeded by Deputy Prime Minister Hailemariam Desalegn, the chairman of the Southern Ethiopian People's Democratic Movement (SEPDM), a coalition member. On 15 February 2018, Hailemariam announced his resignation as both prime minister and chairman of the EPRDF, owing to a growing discontent within the public, fueled by a reaction to 27 years of repression.

On 28 March 2018, in a closed-door election to chair the EPRDF, executive committee members elected the Oromo Peoples’ Democratic Organisation (OPDO) chairman Abiy Ahmed. On 2 April 2018, Ethiopian parliament elected Abiy as prime minister. One of Abiy's first actions after his election was to initiate a warming of relations with Eritrea, a long-time rival of the TPLF, to end a 20-year long border conflict. While this decision was considered a cause of celebration at the time, many within the Tigray Region were heavily critical of this, seeing it as a betrayal of those who died in the 1998–2000 war. The TPLF condemned the peace initiatives, saying they were hastily made, had "fundamental flaws," and also claimed it was decided on without consulting long-time TPLF members.

On 1 December 2019, Abiy merged the ethnic and region-based parties of the EPRDF (which had governed Ethiopia for 28 years) and several opposition parties into his new Prosperity Party. The TPLF, which had long dominated Ethiopian politics, refused to join this new party. After losing the election and being ousted from the federal government, TPLF officials relocated to the Tigray Region, continuing to administer control there while frequently clashing with the federal government. In one instance, the Tigray regional government was reported to have defied the federal government and refused to allow Ethiopian Federal Police to arrest Getachew Assefa, the former chief of the National Intelligence and Security Service (NISS) of Ethiopia and executive member of the TPLF.

The Ethiopian government and its supporters have accused the TPLF of trying to re-establish their rule over the country through violence and force. In turn, the TPLF has accused the federal government of accumulating too much power for itself, and that it was engaging in ethnic discrimination of Tigrayans.

Lead-up to the war 
Throughout 2020, tensions between the federal government and the TPLF escalated in the months leading up to November. In March, the National Election Board of Ethiopia delayed the general elections – originally scheduled for 29 August 2020 – to a then-undetermined date, due to the COVID-19 pandemic. The terms of federal and regional lawmakers, as well as the executive branch, were then extended by federal parliament beyond the October 2020 constitutional mandates.

The TPLF, led by its chairman Debretsion Gebremichael, rejected these measures, arguing that they were unconstitutional, and held its own regional election on 9 September, in defiance of the federal government. Several journalists were barred by the Ethiopian government from travelling to cover Tigray's regional election. Ethiopia considered the Tigray election to be illegal, and responded by slashing federal funding to the region, a decision the TPLF described as "tantamount to declaration of war."

In late September 2020, the TPLF stated that the constitutional term limit of the House of Federation, the House of Peoples' Representatives, the prime minister, and the Council of Ministers was 5 October 2020 and that for this reason, it would consider "the incumbent" constitutionally illegitimate after 5 October; they proposed replacing the government with a technocratic caretaker government, as detailed in a plan posted on Facebook by the Coalition of Ethiopian Federalist Forces. Ethiopian elite units were transported to Gherghera base near Asmara, as part of an alleged pact between Prime Minister Abiy and Eritrean President Isaias Afwerki to "strike out of existence the TPLF," according to former Eritrean Minister of Defence Mesfin Hagos.

In late October 2020, the Ethiopian Reconciliation Commission stated that it was trying to mediate between the federal government and the TPLF, as well as the other regional governments, but that the pre-conditions set by all sides were blocking progress. As tension continued to grow, a brigadier general appointed by Abiy was prevented by the Tigray government from taking up his military post. The same day before the Tigray forces launched the Northern Command attacks, the federal parliament of Ethiopia had suggested designating the TPLF as a terrorist organization.

Constitutional context

The 1995 Constitution of Ethiopia states in Article 39.1, "Every Nation, Nationality, and People in Ethiopia has an unconditional right to self-determination, including the right to secession." Article 62.9 grants the House of Federation the right to "order Federal intervention if any State [government], in violation of [the] Constitution, endangers the constitutional order."

Course of the war

Initial fighting (3–28 November 2020) 

Northern Command attacks

Just before midnight on 3 November 2020, Tigray Special Forces and allied local militia attacked the Ethiopian National Defense Force (ENDF) Northern Command headquarters in Mekelle, the Fifth Battalion barracks in Dansha, and other Northern Command bases. Several people were killed and the TPLF claimed the attack was carried out in self-defence or preemptive self-defense.

In retaliation, an Ethiopian offensive was launched on 4 November, which was accompanied by the declaration of a state of emergency, the creation of the State of Emergency Inquiry Board and a shutdown of government services in the Tigray Region. During the subsequent days, skirmishes continued and the Ethiopian federal parliament declared the creation of an interim government for Tigray. Ethiopian offensives in the north were accompanied with airstrikes and several towns and cities were retaken.

Early massacres

On the night of 9 to 10 November 2020, 600 civilians, mostly Amharas and Welkait, were killed in a massacre in the town of Mai Kadra with machetes and knives used by local militias and police loyal to the TPLF, according to preliminary investigations by Amnesty International and the Ethiopian Human Rights Commission; other refugees, interviewed by the Financial Times and Reuters, said it was the Amhara militia who were the perpetrators and Tigrayans who were the victims. Two days later, refugees interviewed by the Daily Telegraph, The Guardian and The New York Times stated that Amhara militias, including Fano, and the ENDF carried out beatings and massacres of 92 Tigrayans in Humera. Humera was shelled from the direction of the Eritrean–Ethiopian border for two days around 9–11 November. The ENDF gained control of the town one day later.

Offensives of joint ENDF-Amhara Region-Eritrean forces into Tigray were facilitated by the intervention of "Pterosaurus" drones, launched by the United Arab Emirates from its base in Assab, Eritrea. The Chinese-made, armed drones bombed Tigrayan artillery and weapons depots. In the late hours of 13 November 2020, Tigray forces fired a rocket towards the airports of Bahir Dar and Gondar in the Amhara Region. On 14 November, Tigray forces launched rockets at the Eritrean capital of Asmara, but the missiles missed. The Tigray government claimed these locations contained military terminals that served as bases to carry out airstrikes.

Mekelle offensive

From 17 to 19 November, Ethiopian forces captured the Raya district and the towns of Shire, Alamata, Adwa, and Axum, and began moving towards Adigrat. Fighting between Tigray and Eritrea took place in Adi Quala, Zalembesa, Taruna, Ali Tina, Wadqomdi, and Badme. On 23 November, Ethiopian forces reached the regional capital of Mekelle and encircled it. A military spokesperson for Ethiopia, Colonel Dejene Tsegaye, announced that Mekelle would be shelled, and told Tigray civilians to flee the city because Ethiopian forces would show no mercy.

Though TPLF leaders and special forces had already left the city, Ethiopian forces continued their direct assault on Mekelle on the morning of 28 November, and started heavily shelling the city. By the evening, Prime Minister Abiy declared Ethiopian forces had taken full control of the city. In total, 27 civilians were killed and 100 others were injured. The Tigray government vowed to continue fighting.

Tigrayan guerrilla warfare (November 2020 – June 2021) 

Formation of the Tigray Defense Forces
After Ethiopian federal forces and their allies captured Mekelle and other major cities, forces loyal to the Tigray government began to regroup into mountainous areas of the region and reorganized under the banner of the Tigray Defense Forces (TDF). This retreat was partially caused by the fact that a large portion of the TDF's artillery had been destroyed by air strikes. The TDF also began to dig into their positions in rural Tigray, marking the start of a guerrilla campaign against Ethiopian-allied forces from the mountains.

Eritrean occupation of the northeast
On 28 and 29 November, witnesses and survivors, including refugees in Sudan, reported that the Eritrean Defence Forces (EDF) carried out the Axum massacre of about 720 to 800 civilians. The Eritrean government stated that it was angered by Amnesty International's report on the massacre, calling it "transparently unprofessional" and "politically motivated" and accusing Amnesty of fabricating evidence. However, refugees also spoke of the EDF killing 80–150 people in Idaga Hamus on 30 November, as part of a larger series of extrajudicial killings known as the Adigrat massacres.

A witness told Al Jazeera that, on 4 December, Eritrean troops entered her town in southeastern Tigray and attempted to rape her; this statement is corroborated by other survivors and witnesses, who spoke of rampant sexual violence, massacres and destruction of civilian infrastructure committed by the EDF.

In February 2021, the UN chief coordinator of humanitarian efforts Mark Lowcock said that up to 40% of Tigray was not controlled by Ethiopian troops. Aside from Tigrayan rebel forces, he said that much of that area was under the control of the EDF, pursuing their own objectives independent of Ethiopian command. By early March, residents said that the number of Eritrean soldiers in Tigray was in the thousands.

Continued insurgency
By mid-December, fighting had reached Hagere Selam, Samre, Dogu’a, Kolla Tembien, May Tsemre and localities around Maychew. During this time, a violently enforced curfew was set up by Ethiopian forces along with Eritrean soldiers. According to the Europe External Programme with Africa (EEPA), in Wukro over 200 people were killed and the town was left deserted. The Ethiopian government denied involvement in the killing.

On 9 January 2021, Ethiopian TV reported that 300 refugees in Hitsats camp were executed by the TPLF. According to refugees, pro-TPLF forces used Hitsats as a base for several weeks in November 2020, killing several refugees who wanted to leave the camp to get food and, in one incident, killed nine young Eritrean men in revenge for having lost a battle against the EDF. On 18 February, unidentified militiamen ambushed a passenger bus in Adi Mesino, killing six and injuring 10.

Ultimately, the early gains made by the ENDF and EDF against Tigrayan forces did not lead to a decisive defeat of the re-organized and invigorated TDF. In late January, the TDF had rallied and were intensifying their insurgency against Ethiopian forces despite the initial setbacks and heavy losses. During this time fighting was reported to have taken place around Mekelle, and the ENDF had retreated from rural positions towards the city. Thousands of Ethiopian troops supported by artillery, tanks, and airstrikes fought dug-in forces loyal to the Tigray regional government.

According to a report by Ghent University, massacres of civilians continued into March, including around 250 in Humera over the course of three days by unconfirmed perpetrators, and 13 in Grizana by the EDF. That same month, an undated video surfaced that purported to show Ethiopian troops executing 11 unarmed men before throwing their bodies off a cliff near Mahibere Dego.

TDF regains territory
Fighting intensified in early April; by this point, the TDF was in control of the rural areas of central and southern Tigray along with parts of eastern and south-eastern Tigray, while the ENDF was in control of the main roads and urban areas. Amhara and Eritrean forces also controlled parts of Tigray in the west and north, respectively. All sides wished to secure a military victory, but they lacked the ability to do so in the near term, and so they began to prepare for a prolonged conflict. The Tigray Defense Forces were engaged in a war of attrition with popular support from the people of Tigray, who were infuriated by war crimes committed by Eritrean and Ethiopian soldiers and worried about a potential decrease in the region's autonomy. This resulted in the TDF growing in strength and the concept of secession from Ethiopia gaining popularity in Tigray, a stance which was considered likely to inflame Amhara-Tigray territorial disputes.

On 6 May, Ethiopia's House of Peoples’ Representatives declared the TPLF as a terrorist organization. On 21 May, Ethiopia's military prosecutors convicted 3 soldiers of rape and pressed charges against over 50 others suspected of killing civilians in Tigray or committing rape and other forms of sexual violence. The statement also confirmed reports of two massacres in Tigray, stating that 229 civilians were killed in the town of Mai Kadra at the beginning of November 2020, and accusing Eritrean forces of killing 110 civilians in Axum later that same month.

Tigrayan counter-offensive (June – November 2021) 

Retaking of Mekelle

On 22 June 2021, an Ethiopian military cargo plane was shot down over Samre, marking a turn of the war in the TDF's favor. On 28 June 2021, the Tigray Defense Forces retook the city of Mekelle. People celebrated in the streets of Mekelle as the TDF took the city. Ethiopian soldiers, police and administrators were seen leaving, ahead of the occupation by the TDF. Shortly after hearing news of the TDF advance, the Ethiopian government declared an immediate unilateral ceasefire across the Tigray Region. BBC News reporter Vivienne Nunis characterised the ceasefire as an attempt by Prime Minister Abiy Ahmed to save face, the government having little other option.

On 29 June, Tigrayan forces vowed to continue their offensive and drive into Eritrea or the Amhara Region if necessary, and said that Mekelle was 100% under the control of Tigrayan forces. The International Crisis Group claimed that the TDF now controlled most of the Tigray region. The Ethiopian government claimed, on 30 June, that it could re-enter Mekelle in less than three weeks if it wanted to. In the same announcement, the Ethiopian government stated that all Eritrean forces had withdrawn from the region, though this was not confirmed by the Eritrean government.

Tigray push in Afar and Amhara

On 6 July 2021, the Tigrayan government mobilised to retake western Tigray from Amhara forces. A TDF offensive starting on 12 July resulted in Tigrayan forces capturing southern Tigray, including the towns of Alamata and Korem. The TDF subsequently crossed the Tekezé River and advanced westward, capturing the town of Mai Tsebri in the Tselemti district, and prompting Amhara officials to call on its militias to arm themselves and mobilise. Following the TDF's rapid advances, Abiy threatened to resume war with Tigray and crush the rebels, raising fears of genocide. He called on other regions of Ethiopia to mobilise their special forces. The Oromia, Sidama, and SNNPR regions answered the call and mobilised.

From 17 to 19 July, the TDF began launching attacks in the Afar Region to its east, prompting the Benishangul-Gumuz, Gambela, Harari and Somali regions to join the war. Heavy fighting in western Afar displaced over 54,000 people, and resulted in the TDF reportedly capturing three districts in the region.

While the Tigray government claimed it only entered Afar to target federal forces, experts believe their aim was to sever a portion of National Highway A1, a vital trade route for landlocked Ethiopia, linking the capital of Addis Ababa to the Port of Djibouti, from which most of its petroleum products are imported. Following the TDF's counter-attack on two districts of his region, the Amhara regional President, Agegnehu Teshager, called for the total mobilisation of all people of all ages who are armed in the region to fight against the Tigrayans. A similar call was made in Afar. Meanwhile, the city of Weldiya was captured by the TDF on 12 August 2021.

On 4 August 2021, some Agew people declared themselves independent from the Amhara Region and formed the Agew Liberation Front (ALF). The next day, Lalibela was reported to have been seized by Tigrayan forces. On 9 August, UNICEF executive director Henrietta Fore expressed concern about reports that over 200 people, including 100 children, had been killed in attacks on displaced families sheltering at a health facility and a school in the Afar Region. On 11 August, the TDF and the Oromo Liberation Army (OLA) announced an alliance to overthrow Abiy Ahmed's government, saying they were also in talks with other rebel groups to establish a "grand coalition." With the TDF advancing deeper into Amhara, various cities across the region began enforcing curfews.

On 9 September 2021, the Ethiopian government claimed Tigrayan forces had been "routed" and heavily defeated in the Afar Region. Tigrayan spokesperson Getachew Reda said its forces had seen no fighting in Afar and had redeployed to the adjoining Amhara Region. On 30 September, amid UN concerns about a blockade of aid deliveries to Tigray, the Ethiopian government expelled 7 top UN officials, reportedly because of "meddling" in its internal affairs, giving the officials 72 hours to leave the country.

October 2021 government-allied offensive

On 8 October 2021, the TPLF said that an intensive air campaign by the Ethiopian Air Force began against TDF positions in the North Wollo and North Gondar zones of the Amhara Region, mostly around the towns of Wegeltena, Wurgessa and Haro. He also stated there was a "massive build up of forces on all fronts." The federal government and Amhara regional government did not respond to the claim. On 11 October, Ethiopian-allied forces launched coordinated ground attacks "on all fronts" against the TDF with combined arms including tanks, helicopters, heavy artillery, warplanes, and drones according to the Tigrayan government. General Tsadkan Gebretensae, member of the central command of the TDF said both sides had been preparing for the offensive for months, and predicted that battle would be "decisive."

The new offensive effectively ended the unilateral ceasefire declared by the federal government in June and further deepened fears of the developing famine in Tigray, with a federal government blockade still preventing most aid from arriving. Meanwhile, the continued war prompted regional leaders, including Kenyan President Kenyatta, to voice their concerns and urge peace, while US Secretary of State Blinken met with the AU envoy to Ethiopia, former Nigerian President Olusegun Obasanjo, to discuss the crisis.

On 13 October, Getachew claimed fighting continued intensifying with "staggering" casualties. He also claimed clashes were taking place near Weldiya and that fighting had resumed in Afar, within the Awra and Chifra districts near the Amhara border.

TDF-OLA joint offensive (October – December 2021) 

Fall of Dessie and Kombolcha
On 30 October, it was reported that Dessie had fallen to the TDF. However, control over the city was not immediately certain, with the federal government denying its capture and reports of fierce fighting coming from the town. On the same day, the Amhara regional government declared a state of emergency, which included a region-wide curfew.

South of Kombolcha, the OLA claimed to have seized control over Kemise on the A2 Highway which links Mekelle to the Ethiopian capital of Addis Ababa, and later declared they were considering an offensive towards the capital. The TDF claimed they also linked up with the OLA. Meanwhile, it was reported that a new roundup of ethnic Tigrayans had occurred in Addis Ababa.

State of emergency and rebel coalition

On 2 November 2021, as the counter-offensive came deeper into federal-controlled territory, the Ethiopian government declared a six-month state of emergency, which envisages the possibility to arrest and detain critics of the government without a court warrant, impose curfews, institute censorship, restrict freedom of movement as well as to call any adult person to fight in the war, for fear of serving from three to ten years in prison. Authorities in Addis Ababa also told residents to register their weapons in order to fend off the anticipated offensive. Four other regional governments also made a call to arms. On 5 November, the TPLF, OLA and other rebel groups declared the creation of a nine-group coalition, called the United Front of Ethiopian Federalist and Confederalist Forces.

On 22 November, Prime Minister Abiy stated that he will be leading the fight against the rebels from the battlefront after the TDF claimed to have captured Shewa Robit, saying; "We are now in the final stages of saving Ethiopia." Many countries also urged citizens to leave the country.

Government-allied counter-offensive (November 2021 – March 2022) 

From 26 November to 6 December 2021, Ethiopian allied forces recaptured several towns in the Amhara and Afar regions including Lalibela and Shewa Robit, according to the Ethiopian government. On 6 December, government forces claimed to have recaptured the strategic cities of Dessie and Kombolcha. This was later confirmed by TPLF spokesman Getachew Reda; however, he claimed this was a strategic withdrawal, which was "part of their plan." On 12 December, Reuters reported that forces loyal to the TPLF had recaptured the town of Lalibela less than two weeks after government forces and their allies had recaptured control of the town for themselves. Nevertheless, by the end of the month, the federal government had successfully repelled the incursion towards Addis Ababa, and Tigrayan forces were pushed back to Tigray.

Fighting slows down
On 20 December 2021, the TPLF announced they had withdrawn their troops from Amhara and Afar, saying they were hoping to create, as stated by TPLF chairman Debretsion Gebremichael, "a decisive opening for peace." Debretsion also requested the establishment of a no-fly zone over Tigray, as well as a weapons embargo against Ethiopia and Eritrea. Following these developments, the ENDF stated that it would not advance any deeper into the Tigray region. However, in January 2022, the Ethiopian Air Force began launching a bombing campaign in the Tigray Region, killing 108 people, including at least 56 from an airstrike targeting an IDP camp in Dedebit.

On 7 January – the same day as the Dedebit airstrike – Ethiopia released a number of opposition leaders from prison, including some from the TPLF, and said they desired to have a dialogue with the Tigrayan leadership. On 26 January, the Ethiopian council of ministers also proposed to end the state of emergency.

Ceasefire period (March – August 2022) 

On 24 March 2022, the Ethiopian government declared an indefinite humanitarian truce, in order to allow the delivery of humanitarian aid into Tigray. During the ceasefire, both Ethiopia and the TPLF agreed to have talks about an official end to the war. A number of outstanding issues – in particular, the presence of pro-government troops in Tigray's Western Zone and restoring access to basic public service to Tigray – were topics of discussion throughout. Though there were initial hopes of finding a peaceful solution to ending the war, the talks soon became characterized by steadily increasing hostilities between the negotiation parties. By August, talks started to break down, with both the Ethiopian government and the TPLF accusing each other of refusing to make peace.

Resurgence of fighting (August – November 2022) 
In late August 2022, after months of ceasefire, fighting resumed. Both sides blamed each other for initiating the fighting, and both also expressed frustration "for a lack of progress towards negotiations to end the 21-month conflict." The fighting itself concentrated in the border area connecting Tigray, Amhara and Afar. Allegations emerged that the Tigray were smuggling in weapons, leading to the Ethiopian Air Force shooting down a plane, claiming it was carrying weapons for the TPLF; meanwhile, the government was accused of indiscriminate air bombardments on civilian targets. Civilians reported that pro-government militias, such as FANO, had gotten involved as well. Exacerbating tensions were severe food shortages, an issue that remained unsolved have particularly affected the Tigray region.

Joint Eritrean–Ethiopian offensive
On 27 August, the TDF captured the town of Kobo, following the ENDF's withdrawal. Ethiopia and Eritrea subsequently announced an offensive in North Tigray on 1 September. On 13 September 2022, the TPLF said Eritrea had taken Sheraro. The town's capture by Eritrea and the fighting in nearby areas displaced around 210,000 people, most of whom fled to the city of Shire. A day later Ethiopian airstrikes on Mekelle killed at least ten people. By mid-September, reports emerged of Eritrea engaging in mass mobilization of the country's reservists to be sent to Tigray.

On 20 September, the government of Tigray said Eritrea had invaded the region, and that heavy fighting was taking place across northern Tigray. The TDF had, thus far, largely resisted the offensive, and reportedly launched a counterattack to retake Sheraro. Meanwhile, Ethiopian and Eritrean forces began massing in Abala and Berhale in the Afar Region, within striking distance of Mekelle. On September 27, an airstrike – allegedly carried out by Eritrea – struck the northern town of Adi Dairo while it was celebrating Meskel, killing at least six civilians and injured 19 more. On 2 October, the TPLF announced it had withdrawn troops from Amhara's North Wollo Zone, including Kobo, to be redeployed north to reinforce lines under heavy Eritrean attack but warned it would return if their southern border is threatened. Three days later, a second airstrike hit Adi Dairo, killing between 50 and 65 people according to aid workers in the town.

Full-scale mobilization
On 10 October, the TPLF claimed that Eritrea was escalating its offensive, sending more forces towards Rama, Tserona, and Zalambessa in the far north, with one aid worker saying it is the heaviest fighting since hostilities resumed. Later reports confirmed that Eritrea was intensifying its efforts to mobilize more troops for the war; it detained "elderly mothers and fathers," and sought draft-dodgers. Tigray mobilized its citizens too, calling on every able-bodied person to join the fight. Amidst the three-front offensive launched by Ethiopia and Eritrea, estimates put the number of Ethiopian casualties at over 90,000 in a single month, while Tigrayan casualties were also deemed incredibly high. According to peace and conflict studies researcher Kjetil Tronvoll, it is likely that 100,000 people had been killed over the preceding few weeks, and alleged that Eritrea and Ethiopia were using human wave attacks to overwhelm Tigrayan defenses.

On 17 October, Ethiopia said that it would seize every airport and other key infrastructure in the region; that same day, the strategic city of Shire was taken by Eritrea and Ethiopia, leading to the evacuation of thousands of its inhabitants. Ethiopian forces then took Alamata and Korem in the south. By 22 October, ENDF and EDF-allied forces had also captured Adwa and Axum, even as peace talks with the TPLF were about to commence in South Africa. Witnesses from a number of towns told the Associated Press that Eritrean forces were regularly killing civilians between 23 and 29 October.

Second ceasefire (November 2022 – present) 

On 25 October 2022, AU Commission Chairperson, Moussa Faki, announced that peace talks involving the Ethiopian government and the TPLF had commenced in Pretoria, South Africa. Hopes that these talks could definitively stop the war, however, remained low, as fighting did not appear to slow down, and Ethiopia vocalized their distrust about the peace process. Still, negotiations continued onward, and on 2 November, Ethiopia and the TPLF announced that they had signed an agreement for a cessation of hostilities (made effective the next day on 3 November, marking the two-year anniversary of the war); however, Eritrea and other warring parties were not involved in the agreement, leaving their status ambiguous. On 12 November, both parties signed a deal to allow humanitarian aid into Tigray. By 29 December, federal police were reported to have returned to Tigray, while flights and internet access had also been restored.

Despite important steps towards peace and deescalation being made between the government and the TPLF, Amhara and Eritrean forces continued to launch attacks on Tigrayans throughout November and December. From 17 to 25 November alone, Eritrea was reported to have destroyed 241 houses and killed at least 111 people.

Spillover 

The intensity of the war has led to spillover effects on the surrounding countries in the region, especially in Sudan.

By the end of November 2020, thousands of people were believed to have been killed in the conflict and around 44,000 fled to Sudan. On 15 December 2020, four Sudanese soldiers were killed, and 27 others were injured near the Ethiopia–Sudan border, in what Sudan claimed to be an ambush by Ethiopian forces and militias. A Sudanese soldier later claimed that Ethiopian forces had launched artillery attacks on them and intruded into the Jebel al-Teyyour area, located 7 kilometres inside Sudan. Other soldiers claimed that the attackers were Amhara Region militias. Ethiopia claimed the clashes were Ethiopia trying to stop a Sudanese militia which had tried to cross into Ethiopian territory and seize farmlands. In response to the killings, Sudan started to build up its military along the border with Ethiopia.

International involvement 

Since the war began, both regional and international powers have been actively involved in the conflict. A number of reports have been made alleging that China, Iran, Turkey and the United Arab Emirates were all providing military support for the Ethiopian government via the sale of weaponized drones. As early as December 2020, there were unconfirmed rumors that Emirati drones were being stationed in the Eritrean port city of Assab. The victory of Ethiopian forces over Dessie and Kombolcha in December 2021 was partly due to the drones supplied by Ethiopia's allies. In Debretsion Gebremichael’s order to withdraw all his forces from Tigray borders in December 2021, he mentioned "the drones provided by foreign powers" as a major factor that prompted his decision.

Alleged Somali involvement 
There have been multiple unconfirmed reports of Somali troops being sent from a secret training base in Eritrea run by the National Intelligence and Security Agency to fight against the newly formed TDF. The first of these reports came in January 2021 from unverified social media accounts. The same month, Somalia's information minister, Osman Abukar Dubbe, confirmed Somali soldiers were training in Eritrea, but denied any of these troops had been sent to Tigray. According to the Voice of America, several sources with direct knowledge of the program, including three Somali officials and a foreign diplomat, confirmed to them that Somali troops have been training in neighbouring Eritrea. In January 2022, The Globe and Mail reported evidence of Somali troops were involved and they had committed atrocities in Tigray. The report noted that before the war began, Somali forces under the leadership of the Eritrean Army had been stationed in trenches along the border.

A small group of parents also protested in Mogadishu about what they said was the government's mismanagement of the issue. They demanded information on their loved ones who they say they haven't seen in a year. The head of Somalia's parliamentary committee on foreign affairs asked the Somali president to investigate claims by family members that their sons had gone off to fight in Ethiopia and are now missing. On 19 January 2021, the Somali government denied the claim that Somali troops had trained in Eritrea and then deployed in the Tigray Region of Ethiopia.

Former head of the Somali National Intelligence and Security Agency, Abdilsalan Guld, claimed that Somali troops were sent to Tigray. Guld stated that the soldiers, aged from 20 to 30 years old, were secretly taken from Mogadishu and sent to Asmara for military training. Guld stated that 370 of the Somali troops trained by Eritrea were killed in Tigray, and hundreds of others were wounded.

War crimes and human rights violations

All sides in the conflict have been accused of violating international human rights law, with evidence of unlawful killings, torture and sexual violence being committed. As of late 2022, the combined impact of wartime violence, famine and a lack of medical access had killed an estimated 385,000-600,000 people, with other reported estimates reaching numbers as high as 700,000-800,000 killed.

Crimes against humanity and genocide 

Many sources have accused the Ethiopian and Eritrean governments of engaging in crimes against humanity via ethnic cleansing of Tigrayans. The Ethiopian and Eritrean governments have also been accused of genocide. According to the EU's special envoy to Ethiopia, Pekka Haavisto, senior members of the Ethiopian government called for "wip[ing] out" all Tigrayans for 100 years. The Ethiopian Government denied the allegations.

On 4 June 2021, the non-profit Genocide Watch classified the events in Tigray as step 9 of genocide (eradication), as well as step 10 (denial). They issued another emergency alert on 20 November 2021, stating that "both sides are committing genocide," referring to detentions of thousands of people based on Oromo or Tigrayan ethnic identity, and arguing that "Prime Minister Abiy Ahmed's hate speech and calls for war" together with attacks by the ENDF and TPLF put Ethiopia into stages 4 (dehumanization), 6 (polarization), 8 (persecution), and 9 (extermination) of the ten stages of genocide.

Ethnic profiling of Tigrayans 

Ethnic profiling against Tigrayans occurred during the Tigray War, with Ethiopians of Tigrayan ethnicity being put on indefinite leave from Ethiopian Airlines or refused permission to board, prevented from overseas travel, and an "order of identifying ethnic Tigrayans from all government agencies and NGOs" being used by federal police to request a list of ethnic Tigrayans from an office of the World Food Programme. Tigrayans' houses were arbitrarily searched and Tigrayans' bank accounts suspended. During the conflict, many Tigrayans were profiled both professionally and socially, with many fired or called names when out in public as a result of the conflict, such as Tigrayan military members having their weapons confiscated or dismissed from duty. A hotspot for this form of profiling took place in Addis Ababa, including disappearances of major Ethiopian officials and arrests of Tigrayans on the grounds that they supported the TPLF, which was designated as a terrorist organisation in May 2021 by Ethiopian parliament.

Ethnic Tigrayan members of Ethiopian components of United Nations peacekeeping missions were disarmed and some forcibly flown back to Ethiopia, at the risk of torture or execution, according to United Nations officials. The State of Emergency Taskforce stated that the Tigrayan peacekeepers were returned to Ethiopia because of "infiltration of TPLF elements in various entities." On 1 November 2021, Prime Minister Abiy Ahmed stated that "we should closely follow those who work for the enemy and live amongst us," as reports of a new roundup of ethnic Tigrayans came out of Addis Ababa.

Sexual violence 

Wartime rape and sexual violence was also widespread, being perpetrated by virtually all sides. There were "deeply distressing reports of sexual and gender-based violence, extrajudicial killings, [and the] widespread destruction and looting of public and private property by all parties" according to the UN High Commissioner for Human Rights. More than 136 cases of rape were reported in hospitals in Mekelle, Ayder, Adigrat and Wukro in eastern Tigray between December 2020 and January 2021, with indications that there are many more such unreported cases. As of August 2021, there were 512 to 514 rape victims registered with Ethiopian hospitals; however, the real number is probably much larger than that and can be as large as 120,000 by some estimations, and many sources believe the sexual violence in Tigray was intentionally committed with the purpose of destroying the morale of the enemy, to genocide and genetically cleanse certain populations, and to spread STIs as a form of biological warfare.

Often, soldiers, and militias subjected Tigrayan women and girls, including pregnant women and young girls, to rape, gang rape, sexual slavery, sexual mutilation, and other forms of sexual torture. Such sexual violence is often accompanied with other forms of physical and mental abuse, including burning their victims with hot iron or cigarettes, forcing metal rods or nails into their victim's genitals, raping their victim in front of their family members, forcing their victims to rape their family members, calling their victims by derogatory words and ethnic slurs, etc.  There were also reports that Tigrayan forces had gang-raped dozens of women and underage girls in at least two towns in the Amhara Region, and girls – some as young as 14 – were identified as victims of rape in the towns of Chenna and Kobo in August and September 2021.

After being subjected to sexual violence, many women become infected with STIs like HIV, who face difficulty getting treatment due to a sense of shame, as well as the collapse of medical infrastructure caused by the war.

Attacks on humanitarian workers
There have been several reported attacks on humanitarian workers, including attacks by Ethiopian government soldiers. The Danish Refugee Council and the International Rescue Committee reported killings of their staff in early December 2020. Although the Ethiopian federal government claimed to have given "full and unhindered access for humanitarian actors to operate in all parts of the region," many humanitarian agencies reported having been repulsed at army checkpoints and blocked from entry to various regions. There were accusations by US officials that armed forces were specifically singling out humanitarian workers for an attack.

On 23 March 2021, a driver from Médecins Sans Frontières was beaten by Ethiopian soldiers after witnessing extrajudicial killings by Ethiopian government soldiers. Following the 23 June bombing of Togoga, there were reports of Ethiopian government soldiers firing on ambulances to prevent them from reaching the injured. On 25 June 2021, three Médecins Sans Frontières workers were found murdered near their car in Tigray.

Investigations 

Investigations into the war crimes include the Ethiopian Human Rights Commission (EHRC) and Office of the United Nations High Commissioner for Human Rights (OHCHR) joint investigation, and the ACHPR Tigray investigation by the African Commission on Human and Peoples' Rights (ACHPR).

Humanitarian crisis

Humanitarian aid

According to the United Nations (UN), some 2.3 million children have been cut off from desperately needed aid and humanitarian assistance. Since the start of the conflict, the Ethiopian federal government has strictly controlled access to the Tigray Region, and the UN has said it is frustrated that talks with the Ethiopian government had not yet secured adequate humanitarian access for "food, including ready-to-use therapeutic food for the treatment of child malnutrition, medicines, water, fuel, and other essentials that are running low" said UNICEF. By 13 March 2021, the UN and its partners reached about 0.9 million people with complete food baskets, and 0.7 million people with clean water. Despite the progress made, many are still hard to reach due to ongoing fighting. About 4.5 million people of are still in need of aid and about 1 million of that are not in accessible areas due to ongoing fighting.

There has been limited access to clean water due to hygiene and sanitation services largely being disrupted across Tigray. The Tigray Regional Water Bureau reported that out of 36 villages it assessed, only 4 had partially functioning water sources. Along with that, an estimated 250 motorized water pumping systems have been out of order, and the status of 11,000 hand pumps in rural areas was unknown. Because of this, there has been a heightened risk of outbreaks of water-borne diseases and COVID-19.

In February 2021, GOAL Ethiopia, the International Rescue Committee (IRC), MCMDO, MSF-Spain, and World Vision, found that nearly one in seven children in 16 woredas and town administrations across Tigray were acutely malnourished. While in Enderta, Abi Adi and Shire, GOAL and IRC reported that 16.6% of children screened had acute malnutrition with 3.5% suffering from severe acute malnutrition.

According to the UN, in March 2021, out of more than 260 health centres in Tigray before the war, only 31 were fully functional, while 7 were partially functional. According to the World Health Organization (WHO), all of the functioning hospitals and health centres in Tigray had a lack of medical supplies, drugs, and equipment. UN partners reported continued looting of health facilities. Only 16% of the health facilities had vaccination services and only 17% had maternal services (antenatal care, birth delivery, etc.).

On 31 August 2021, USAID's mission director in Ethiopia, Sean Jones said: "We do have proof that several of our warehouses have been looted and completely emptied in the areas, particularly in Amhara, where TPLF soldiers have gone into, I do believe that the TPLF has been very opportunistic," in a televised interview with state broadcaster EBC in Addis Ababa. All parties to the conflict have been accused by USAID of looting aid shipments.

By the summer of 2022, the government blockade of essential services to Tigray was still in place, and the humanitarian situation remained severe, with roughly 13 million people being in need of food aid. According to the World Food Programme, while international aid had technically been allowed into the region during the 2022 ceasefire, in practice, very little aid was reaching the people that needed it most, largely due to fuel not being made available in these area. On 25 August (one day after the war resumed), the WFP accused the TPLF of stealing 570,000 liters of fuel meant to transport humanitarian aid.

In late October 2022, it was revealed that the Tigray Region was running out of medical supplies, with the CEO of their largest hospital saying it was "doomed to collapse soon." WHO officials stated that childhood vaccination rates had plummeted from 90% (before the war) to under 10%. On 29 October, UNICEF reported that around 29.7 million people in Ethiopia were in need of humanitarian assistance.

Internal and forced displacement

In December 2020, the UN estimated more than one million people had been internally displaced by the fighting. More than 50,000 people have fled to Sudan due to the conflict. Communications and travel links were still blocked, and Human Rights Watch warned that "actions that deliberately impede relief supplies" would violate international humanitarian law. Possible COVID-19 outbreaks were feared as refugees fleeing the Tigray conflict sheltered in crowded camps. By March 2021, Shire had become a major centre for internally displaced people and humanitarian aid distribution.

In September 2021, the humanitarian situation continued to worsen in Tigray, Afar and Amhara Regions, due both to the armed conflict itself and due to bureaucratic obstruction. Two thousand displaced people returned to the Fantí Rasu zone in Afar Region after the ENDF and Afar Special Forces regained control and OCHA partner organisations' access to improved.

UNICEF stated that by the end of September 2022, around 574,000 more people in Afar, Amhara and Tigray were left displaced after fighting resumed in August 2022; they also reported that over 870,000 had become refugees.

Western Zone of Tigray 

In November 2020, the Amhara Region Special Force and Amhara militias loyal to the Amhara regional government took control of the western zone of Tigray in order to settle a decades-old land dispute. They claim the area was taken from them by force in 1992 after TPLF forces overthrew the communist PDRE government and divided the country into ethnic regional states. They have also claimed the woredas (districts) of Welkait, Tegede, Kafta Humera, Tselemti, and Raya to be theirs.

Since then, the area has been under the de facto control of Amhara regional authorities. Their control has been marked by reports of ethnically motivated violence and forced displacement. By February 2021, about 45,000 civilians had been forced to leave the zone due to extrajudicial killings, arbitrary detentions, and the disappearances of people, especially young men. One refugee interviewed by Reuters said that if they didn't leave when they did, they would have been killed by Amhara forces. 41 other refugees interviewed have also described attacks, looting, and threats by Amhara forces.

In March 2021, Mulu Nega, then leader of the federal-government-appointed Transitional Government of Tigray, stated that Amhara de facto administrators of Western Tigray used violence against ethnic Tigrayans and forcibly displaced them. Yabsira Eshetie, the administrator of the area, denied the claims. The Amhara government also denied the reports of forced displacement and asked the Ethiopian government to modify the border between the Amhara and Tigray regions. US Secretary of State Antony Blinken stated that there had been acts of ethnic cleansing in Tigray.

Eritrean refugees 

In November 2020, the UN warned of "very critical" supply shortages for the nearly 100,000 Eritrean refugees who, prior to the war, were registered in four camps in Tigray region. Later that same month, the UN reported that people in Tigray were fleeing Mekelle. The federal government had warned of "no mercy" if Tigray forces and residents remained intermingled. As of 2 February 2021, 20,000 of the Eritrean refugees in Tigray, mostly from the Hitsats and Shimelba camps, remained unaccounted for, according to the United Nations High Commissioner for Refugees.

Internet and media

Role of online social networks

Claire Wilmot, writing in The Washington Post, found that a significant number of new, single-issue Twitter accounts were opened in the immediate aftermath of the Northern Command attacks. Most appeared to be authentic accounts from people seeking to raise international awareness of the conflict in the midst of a communications blackout in Tigray. The Ethiopian government cited disinformation and hate speech to justify communications blackouts. Researchers suggested that reducing access to information could help to create contexts where misinformation can thrive because it reduces the ability to verify information. In late July 2021, a report emerged that there was coordination in social media messaging and media reportage of the conflict in Ethiopia, to an extent it mirrored an earlier Syrian hybrid information campaign designated as Project Basma.

The Ethiopian government tried to control the information environment by positioning itself as the sole provider of reliable information. In February, pro-government groups called on their supporters in Ethiopia and the diaspora to combat what they called "TPLF fake news" online. Pro-government groups used tactics similar to those of pro-Tigray groups to push their narrative of the conflict, though as of 5 February, pro-government campaigns had produced fewer Tweets overall. Both Agence France-Presse and BBC News have documented examples of old or manipulated photos, which misleadingly endorsed either the federal Ethiopian government or the TPLF.

Researchers found that groups use tactics such as "copy and paste" campaigns hosted on websites, which include instructions for opening new accounts, copying and pasting pre-written tweets, and tagging influencers. Both campaigns produced disinformation and misinformation, though the majority of content produced was activist in nature. Wilmot suggested that the lines between authentic political activity and deliberate manipulation of online content during the conflict were increasingly blurred.

Facebook 

Facebook has been heavily criticized for its perceived role in fuelling ethnic tensions during the war, and has faced accusations that, in choosing not to crack down on hate speech being spread by Ethiopian users, it is complicit in cases of ethnic cleansing in the country.

Restriction of media coverage

The Ethiopian government had engaged in repeated crackdowns on media coverage throughout the war. In November 2021 (during the 2021–2022 state of emergency), the Ethiopian Media Authority (EMA) threatened to cancel the media licences of BBC News, Reuters, CNN and Associated Press, accusing the news organisations of having "consistently disseminated news that sowed seeds of animosity among people and compromised the sovereignty of the country." The EMA cited "reporting the Law enforcement operation as a genocidal campaign" as an example of misleading information aiming to "undermin[e] the [federal] government's efforts to address the humanitarian crisis in the Tigray region."

On 20 May 2022, Ethiopian law enforcement began arresting journalists en masse, with 4,500 people in the Amhara Region alone being taken into custody. One Amhara law enforcement official described this as a way to maintain "law and order" and "get rid of outside enemies."

The media restrictions resulted in what has been described  as an "information blackout." Many journalists, both local and international, have noted the difficulty they face in trying to report on the war, as they risk the possibility of getting either killed or imprisoned by government forces. By December 2021, the Committee to Protect Journalists described both Ethiopia and Eritrea as the worst "jailers of journalists" in sub-Saharan Africa.

Peace process

Several proposals for peace negotiations and mediation were made involving some of the main groups involved in the war. Of these, this includes: an emergency Intergovernmental Authority on Development summit in December 2020; a joint statement by the National Congress of Great Tigray, the Tigray Independence Party, and Salsay Weyane Tigray describing their eight pre-conditions for peace in February 2021; a mediation group called "A3+1," (consisting of three African countries, Kenya, Niger and Tunisia, and one non-African country, Saint Vincent and the Grenadines) in July–August 2021; and a March–August 2022 ceasefire wherein Ethiopian and Tigrayan officials attempted to negotiate a peaceful end to the conflict.

Although, the war had not yet fully concluded, on 2 November 2022, the Ethiopian government and Tigrayan leaders signed a peace accord, with the African Union as a mediator, and agreed on "orderly, smooth and coordinated disarmament". The agreement was made effective the next day on 3 November, marking the two-year anniversary of the war.

Reactions

The Tigray War has been the subject of numerous reactions and protests worldwide.

See also

 2020 in Eritrea
 2020 in Ethiopia
 Eritrean–Ethiopian War
 Eritrean–Ethiopian border conflict
Ethiopian civil conflict (2018–present)
Ethiopian Civil War (1974–1991)
 List of civil wars

Notes

References

 
Conflicts in 2020
Conflicts in 2021
Conflicts in 2022
2020 in Ethiopia
2021 in Ethiopia
2022 in Ethiopia
2020 in Eritrea
2021 in Eritrea
2022 in Eritrea
Ethiopian civil conflict (2018–present)
Civil wars involving the states and peoples of Africa
Ethnicity-based civil wars
Political repression in Ethiopia
Wars involving Eritrea
Wars involving Ethiopia
Eritrea–Ethiopia military relations
Eritrea–Sudan relations
Ethiopia–Sudan relations
War
Afar Region
Amhara Region